David W. Osborne (born March 27, 1964, in Oldham County, Kentucky) is an American politician and a Republican member of the Kentucky House of Representatives representing District 59 since the May 24, 2005 special election to fill the vacancy of Representative Timothy Feeley. Since January 8, 2019, Osborne has served as Speaker of the Kentucky House of Representatives. He previously served as Acting Speaker of the House and Speaker Pro Tempore.

Education
Osborne earned his BS in economics and agriculture finance from the University of Kentucky.

Elections
2012 Osborne was unopposed for both the May 22, 2012 Republican Primary, and the November 6, 2012 General election, winning with 20,623 votes.
2005 When District 59 Representative Feeley left the Legislature and left the seat open, Osborne won the 2005 Special election with 2,676 votes (57.9%) against Democratic candidate Jody Curry.
2006 Osborne was challenged in the 2006 Republican Primary, winning with 3,677 votes (74.2%) and was unopposed for the November 7, 2006 General election, winning with 9,783 votes.
2008 Osborne was unopposed for both the 2008 Republican Primary and the November 4, 2008 General election, winning with 20,449 votes.
2010 Osborne was unopposed for both the May 18, 2010 Republican Primary and the November 2, 2010 General election, winning with 15,570 votes.

References

External links
Official page at the Kentucky General Assembly

David Osborne at Ballotpedia
David W. Osborne at the National Institute on Money in State Politics

|-

1964 births
21st-century American politicians
Republican Party members of the Kentucky House of Representatives
Living people
People from Oldham County, Kentucky
Politicians from Louisville, Kentucky
Speakers of the Kentucky House of Representatives
University of Kentucky alumni